The 2005 Cornwall County Council election took place on 5 May 2005, concurrently with other local elections across England and Wales. It was the first election to take place under new ward boundaries, which increased the number of seats from 79 to 82. Cornwall County Council was a county council that covered the majority of the ceremonial county of Cornwall, with the exception of the Isles of Scilly which had an independent local authority. The Liberal Democrats gained control of the council, which had previously been under no overall control.

Election result 

|}

References

External links 

 Election results at Cornwall Council website
 BBC News Cornwall Council results

2005 English local elections
2005
2000s in Cornwall